Natronolimnobius (common abbreviation Nln.) is a genus of the Natrialbaceae.

Taxonomy
As of 2022, Natronolimnobius is a monotypic genus.

Species formerly placed in this taxon
 Natronolimnobius aegyptiacus, now Natrarchaeobaculum aegyptiacum
 Natronolimnobius innermongolicus, now Natronolimnohabitans innermongolicus
 Natronolimnobius sulfurireducens, now Natrarchaeobaculum sulfurireducens

References

Further reading

Scientific journals

Scientific books

Scientific databases

External links

Archaea genera
Taxa described in 2005
Monotypic archaea genera